The Center Road Culvert is a historic stone culvert on Center Road at Mallory Brook in East Montpelier, Vermont.  It was built in 1899 as an early project after the establishment of the Vermont Highway Commission in 1898, and is a well-preserved example of dry-laid stone box culvert.  The last major work on the culvert was performed in 1930, after it suffered damage in Vermont's devastating 1927 floods.  VTrans recommended the culvert undergo preservation rather than replacement following damage from Hurricane Irene, and Mallory Brook is to be rerouted through a larger modern structure.  It was listed on the National Register of Historic Places in 2020.

See also
 
 
 
 National Register of Historic Places listings in Washington County, Vermont
 List of bridges on the National Register of Historic Places in Vermont

References

Bridges on the National Register of Historic Places in Vermont
National Register of Historic Places in Washington County, Vermont
Bridges completed in 1899
Bridges in Washington County, Vermont
Buildings and structures in East Montpelier, Vermont
Road bridges in Vermont
1899 establishments in Vermont